David Allan Caswell, publishing under pen name Allan Caswell, is an English-Australian songwriter and performer, author, record producer, freelance journalist and teacher. Caswell wrote "On the Inside" (the theme from the television series Prisoner) and recorded by Lynne Hamilton. It was a hit record in Australia and New Zealand in 1979.

In 1983, the single "The Australia's Cup" peaked at number 17 on the Australian charts.

Biography

1952-1978: Early years
Allan Caswell was born in Chester and grew up in North Wales, Berkshire, and South London (Mitcham) before migrating to Australia in 1966. He was educated at Wimbledon County Secondary School and later at South Sydney Boys High School.

Caswell's songwriting career started in 1973 when Chris Gilbey signed a song he had written with his brother Brian Caswell to Albert Music in Sydney. However, it was 6 years later when Allan Caswell had a song recorded.

1979-present: Music Career
In 1979, Caswell wrote "On the Inside", which became the theme for the television series Prisoner and later a major international hit song. The success of "On the Inside" triggered a succession of recordings by Patti Page, Cilla Black, The Irish Rovers, Max Bygraves and Acker Bilk, Slim Dusty, The Living End, Chad Morgan, Lynne Hamilton, James Blundell, Anne Kirkpatrick, Don Spencer, Graeme Connors, The Delltones, Doug Ashdown and Ricky May.

Caswell won his first Golden Guitar in Tamworth for Best New Talent in 1980.

In September 1983, Caswell released "The Australia's Cup", which peaked at number 17 on the Australian chart. His first and only top 100 single.

In 1995, Caswell was asked by Don Spencer, on behalf of his Australian Children's Music Foundation, to work with children in Juvenile Detention teaching music and songwriting. He has helped set up similar programs in other centres. He also worked with the Foundation in their aim of making music accessible to underprivileged children.

In 2006, Caswell published his first book, "Writing Great Song Lyrics".

In 2014, Caswell announced he had lost a 10-year legal battle with Sony music over similarities between his song "On the Inside" and Alabama's "Christmas in Dixie"; a song from which Alabama are estimated to have earned over $700,000.

In 2016, Caswell celebrated the 50th Anniversary of his arrival in Australia in 1966 with an album called 50 Years in Oz.

In 2019, he released his autobiography My Version Of The Truth and moved to Queensland where he lives with his wife Marian in Varsity Lakes.

In 2020, Caswell released his 20th album, Tequila Amnesia. He also released his third book, Secrets of Stronger Songwriting.

Discography

Studio albums

Live albums

Singles

Awards and nominations

Country Music Awards of Australia
The Country Music Awards of Australia (also known as the Golden Guitar Awards and originally named Australasian Country Music Awards) is an annual awards night held in January during the Tamworth Country Music Festival, in Tamworth, New South Wales, celebrating recording excellence in the Australian country music industry. Caswell has won eight awards (wins only).

|-
| 1980
| "King of the Rodeo"
| New Talent of the year
| 
|-
| 1981
| "One Armed Bandit" (with Brian Caswell)
| Song of the Year
| 
|-
| 1983
| "Used to Be a Gold Song" (with Keith Potger)
| Song of the Year
| 
|-
| 1986
| "The Garden"
| Song of the Year
| 
|-
| 1988
| "Black Jack Blues Again"
| Male Vocalist of the Year
| 
|-
| 2007
| "A Little Bit of Country in Us All" (with Drew McAlister)
| Vocal Collaboration of the Year
| 
|-
| 2016
| "One Last Muster"
| Bush Ballad of the Year
| 
|-
| 2020
| "Country Copper" 
| Bush Ballad of the Year
| 
|-

Tamworth Songwriters Awards
The Tamworth Songwriters Association (TSA) is an annual songwriting contest for original country songs, awarded in January at the Tamworth Country Music Festival. They commenced in 1986. Allan Caswell has won sixteen awards.
 (wins only)
|-
|rowspan="2"| 1988
| "Black Jack Blues Again" by Allan Caswell
| Contemporary Song of the Year 
| 
|-
| "When We Were Kids" by John Williamson and Allan Caswell
| Country Song of the Year 
| 
|-
| 1989
| Allan Caswell
| Contemporary Song of the Year 
| 
|-
|rowspan="2"| 1990
|rowspan="2"| "You Still Take My Breath Away" by Allan Caswell
| Contemporary Song of the Year 
| 
|-
| Country Song of the Year 
| 
|-
|rowspan="2"| 1991
| "Panda" by Allan Caswell and Don Morrison 
| Children's Song of the Year 
| 
|-
| "Proud" by Allan Caswell  
| Contemporary Song of the Year 
| 
|-
|rowspan="2"| 2011
|rowspan="2"| "Behind Bars" by Allan Caswell
| Country Song of the Year 
| 
|-
| Contemporary Song of the Year 
| 
|-
| 2012
| "The Road That Brought Me Here" by Karen Lynne and Allan Caswell
| Contemporary Song of the Year 
| 
|-
| 2013
| "Skin" by Allan Caswell
| Comedy/ Novelty Song of the Year 
| 
|-
|rowspan="3"| 2017
|rowspan="2"| "Golden Days" by Andrew Wriggleswroth and Allan Caswell
| Contemporary Song of the Year 
| 
|-
| Country Song of the Year 
| 
|-
| "Back When I Was Older" by Andrew Wriggleswroth and Allan Caswell
| Contemporary Song of the Year 
| 
|-
| 2019
| "The Roses Fall" by Andrew Wriggleswroth and Allan Caswell
| Country Ballad of the Year
| 
|-
| 2022
| "Youngie" by Allan Caswell
| Local Heroes Song of the Year 
| 
|-

References

External links
 Allan Caswell

1952 births
Living people
APRA Award winners
English songwriters
English record producers
People from Chester
English emigrants to Australia
Australian country guitarists
Australian songwriters
Australian male guitarists